Frederick Collard may refer to:

Frederick William Collard (1772–1860), British piano manufacturer
Fred Collard (1912–1986), Australian politician